Gints Gilis (born 7 November 1970) is a retired Latvian football midfielder.

He was a son of Jānis Gilis.

References

1970 births
Living people
Latvian footballers
FK Liepājas Metalurgs players
FC Daugava players
Motala AIF players
Association football midfielders
Latvia international footballers
Latvian expatriate footballers
Expatriate footballers in Sweden
Latvian expatriate sportspeople in Sweden